The Vale of Eden is formed by the course of the River Eden, one of the major rivers of Northwest England. It is however of much greater extent than the actual valley of the river, lying between the Cumbrian Mountains (more usually referred to as the Lake District), and the northern part of the Pennine Range. It lies entirely within the county of Cumbria. The river has its source in the peat bogs below Hugh Seat, in the dale of Mallerstang. At first it determinedly sets off South (as Hellgill Beck) before turning back North for the rest of its course – except just before its outlet into the sea which it enters from the East.

The Eden passes through the market towns of Kirkby Stephen and Appleby-in-Westmorland, once the county town of Westmorland. It then bypasses, but remains close to, Penrith where it receives the waters of Ullswater via the River Eamont, its major tributary.  Via some ancient villages and fine bridges it reaches and passes through Carlisle, the major city in this whole area. It then enters the sea where, together with the River Esk, coming down from the North, it forms the Solway Firth which divides Scotland from England on the Atlantic side of the country.

The whole area is gentle and pastoral, undulating and attractive but with bleak, barren and impressive hills on either side.

See also

Rheged

References

External links
 Map and aerial photo sources for:  and 
 "A virtual walk through Mallerstang"

Valleys of Cumbria